Phosphorus oxide can refer to:

 Phosphorus pentoxide (phosphorus(V) oxide, phosphoric anhydride), P2O5
 Phosphorus trioxide (phosphorus(III) oxide, phosphorous anhydride), P2O3
 Phosphorus tetroxide, 
 Several other, less common, oxides of phosphorus, including P4O7, P4O8, P4O9, and P2O6

Gases:
 Phosphorus monoxide, PO
 Phosphorus dioxide,